Charles Duncan Gilfillan (July 4, 1831 – December 19, 1902) was an American politician and businessman.

Life
Gilfillan was born in New Hartford, New York and went to the Homer Academy. He studied at the Hamilton College in 1849 and 1850. Gilfillan moved to Saint Paul, Minnesota Territory in 1851. He studied law and was admitted to the Minnesota bar in 1853. He constructed and set up the Saint Paul waterworks project. Gilfillan owned land in Minnesota including farm land in Redwood County, Minnesota. He died from heart problems at his home in Saint Paul, Minnesota.

The 1882 farmstead of Gilfillan and his son is managed by the Redwood County Historical Society. The estate, which is listed on the National Register of Historic Places, showcases their promotion of progressive farming in southwest Minnesota and is associated with the alienation of seized Dakota reservation land.

Politics
Gilfillan served in the Minnesota House of Representatives in 1865 and 1876 and was a Republican. He then served in the Minnesota Senate from 1876 to 1886. Gilfillan was involved with the Minnesota Historical Society and the Minnesota Valley Historical Society.

Notes

1831 births
1902 deaths
People from New Hartford, New York
Businesspeople from Saint Paul, Minnesota
Politicians from Saint Paul, Minnesota
Minnesota lawyers
Hamilton College (New York) alumni
Republican Party members of the Minnesota House of Representatives
Republican Party Minnesota state senators
19th-century American politicians
19th-century American businesspeople